Hooray, It's a Boy! (German: Hurra - ein Junge!) may refer to:

 Hooray, It's a Boy! (play), a German play by Franz Arnold and Ernst Bach
 Hooray, It's a Boy! (1931 film), a German film directed by Georg Jacoby
 Hooray, It's a Boy! (1953 film), a West German film directed by Ernst Marischka

See also
 It's a Boy, a 1933 British film